HD 178911 Bb is a planet discovered in 2001 by Zucker who used the radial velocity method. The minimum mass of this giant planet is 7.35 times that of Jupiter that orbits close to the star. The period of the planet is 71.5 days and the semi-amplitude is 346.9 m/s.

References

External links 
 

Exoplanets discovered in 2001
Giant planets
Lyra (constellation)
Exoplanets detected by radial velocity

de:HD 178911 B b